"Operate" is a song written and recorded by Peaches. The song was released as a double limited vinyl A-side with "Shake Yer Dix" to promote the release of her second studio album Fatherfucker.

Track listing
UK CD single
 "Operate" – 3:28
 "Shake Yer Dix" – 3:32

Song usage
"Operate" has been used in movies Mean Girls and Waiting....  The song was also used in the American television series Las Vegas (episode title: New Orleans). 

In 2017, following the release of Taylor Swift's "Look What You Made Me Do", some commentators suggested that the song sampled the beat from "Operate". Some Twitter users speculated that the alleged sample was a subtle reference to a Katy Perry tweet warning people to "watch out for the Regina George in sheep's clothing", since George appeared in the Mean Girls scene which featured the Peaches song. For a time, music annotation website Genius listed "Operate" as being sampled in the Swift single. Writing for the Alternative Press, Maggie Dickman argued that Swift's song "clearly sounds like" the Peaches song, and also remarked that Swift's music video was similar to Peaches'. In an article for W, Kyle Munzenrieder argued that the beat in Swift's song sounded similar but not the same, since it was "cleaner and more toned down". In her liner notes, Swift credited a sample of the Right Said Fred song "I'm Too Sexy", but did not list the Peaches song as a sample. A mashup of "Operate" and "Look What You Made Me Do" was posted to YouTube.

Charts

References

Electroclash songs
Peaches (musician) songs
Song recordings produced by Peaches (musician)
Songs written by Peaches (musician)
XL Recordings singles